Gadissie Edato (born 15 March 1973) is an Ethiopian long-distance runner. She competed in the women's marathon at the 2000 Summer Olympics.

References

External links
 

1973 births
Living people
Athletes (track and field) at the 2000 Summer Olympics
Ethiopian female long-distance runners
Ethiopian female marathon runners
Olympic athletes of Ethiopia
Place of birth missing (living people)
20th-century Ethiopian women
21st-century Ethiopian women